Aisea is a masculine given name that may refer to
Aisea Havili (born 1977), Tongan rugby union player
Aisea Katonivere (died 2013), Fijian chief and politician
Aisea Natoga (born 1990), Fijian rugby union player 
Aisea Tohi (born 1987), Tongan sprint runner
Aisea Tuidraki (1916–1966), Fijian cricketer 
Aisea Tuilevu (born 1972), Fijian rugby union player